Moslem Rostamiha (born 18 June 1992) is an Iranian professional futsal player. He is currently a member of Safir Gofteman in the Iranian Futsal Super League.

Honours

Country

Club 
 Iranian Futsal Super League
 Runners-up (1): 2015–16 (Mes Sungun)

Individual 
 Best player:
 Best Young Player of the 2014–15 Iranian Futsal Super League (Mes Sungun)
 Top Goalscorer:
 Iranian Futsal Super League: 2014–15 (Mes Sungun) (25 goals)

References

External links 
 

1992 births
Living people
People from Qazvin Province
Iranian men's futsal players
Futsal forwards
Gostaresh Foolad FSC players
Mes Sungun FSC players
Sunich FSC players
21st-century Iranian people